The United States national baseball team represents the United States in international-level baseball competitions. The team is currently ranked 3rd in the world by the World Baseball Softball Confederation. The United States has won many international tournaments, many of which are now discontinued. Most notably the team won the Olympic baseball tournament in 2000, and the World Baseball Classic (WBC) in 2017.

The United States national team debuted in the Baseball World Cup in 1938. The tournament was discontinued in 2011 in favor of the best-on-best World Baseball Classic. The United States won the tournament four times. In the 2000 Baseball Olympic games, the United States won their first Olympic gold in baseball.

The United States was an inaugural member of the World Baseball Classic, making its debut in the first edition. In their first three appearances in the WBC, the best finish for the Americans was fourth place in 2009. In 2017, the team won the WBC title for the first time by defeating Puerto Rico in the final game.

Team USA qualified for the 2020 Summer Olympics by winning the eight-team Americas Qualifying Event in June 2021. In the Olympic competition, held in Tokyo in July and August 2021, the team won the silver medal, losing to hosts Japan in the gold medal game.

The team is governed by USA Baseball, and its headquarters/training facilities are located in Cary, North Carolina. Along with the professional national team, USA Baseball also fields a Collegiate, 18U, 15U, and 12U National baseball team. All of the teams contribute to the WBSC ranking of the US National team through various tournaments hosted by the World Baseball Softball Confederation.

Throughout the years many high-level players have been developed by USA Baseball, and have played on the national team before becoming professional players. Many players who were currently playing in Major League Baseball have also joined the team for the World Baseball Classic and Olympic baseball tournament.

Current roster

The roster for the 2023 World Baseball Classic

Results and fixtures
The following is a list of professional baseball game results currently active in the latest version of the WBSC World Rankings, as well as any future matches that have been scheduled.

Legend

2019

2021

2022

2023

Primary national team tournament records

World Baseball Classic

The tournament was the first of its kind to have the national teams of IBAF's member federations feature professional players from the major leagues around the world, including Major League Baseball.

Record by team

2006: Inaugural Classic

On January 17, the United States announced its provisional 60-man roster (52 players in all), and whittled down the squad mixed with youth and experience to 30 players on February 14, 2006. Sixteen of the 30 Major League clubs were represented on the 2006 squad, including multiple representatives from the New York Yankees (4), Houston Astros (3), Washington Nationals (3), Atlanta Braves (2), Boston Red Sox (2), Chicago Cubs (2), Colorado Rockies (2), Houston Astros (2), and Texas Rangers (2). The fact that four Yankees were selected for the squad irked Yankees owner George Steinbrenner, who was opposed to the WBC being held in the middle of spring training to the point where at his team's complex in Tampa, Florida, he posted a sign apologizing for their absence and mocking the tournament in the process. Major League Baseball Commissioner Bud Selig promptly ordered him to take down the sign the next day.

Manager Buck Martinez brought his 17 years of professional experience as a major league catcher, and 1+ seasons as Toronto Blue Jays' (–) skipper to the U.S. team. Former big league managers Davey Johnson and Marcel Lachemann served as hitting coach and pitching coach, respectively.

Along with fellow North American rivals Canada and Mexico, the U.S. hosted the South Africa. Round One games were held at Chase Field in Phoenix, Arizona and Scottsdale Stadium in Scottsdale, Arizona. The top two teams advanced to Angel Stadium of Anaheim in Anaheim, California.
Despite a surprising loss to Canada, the United States advanced to the second round via tiebreaker. However, second-round losses to South Korea and Mexico allowed Japan to advance over the Americans via tiebreak.

2009: America's second-best finish

The United States competed in Pool C of the 2009 World Baseball Classic along with Italy, Venezuela, and host Canada. The U.S. won the pool opener against Canada by a score of 6-, and secured advancement into Round 2 by defeating Venezuela in a 15–6 slugfest. Venezuela, however, came back to defeat the U.S. in the championship game of Pool C, 5–3.

On March 14, in their first match of round 2 against Puerto Rico, in Miami, Florida's Dolphin Stadium, the United States was mercy ruled for the first time in international competition, losing 11–1 in seven innings. Adam Dunn and Captain Derek Jeter were among the ones to voice their distaste with the severe beating. Manager Davey Johnson even stated "I should have stayed there", referencing a wedding he was at earlier in the day.

The United States came on strong the following day against the surprising Netherlands (who had already eliminated a tournament super power: The Dominican Republic), jumping out to a 6–0 lead in the fourth inning, and winning 9–3. With Puerto Rico losing to Venezuela 2–0 the following day, the U.S. would face Puerto Rico once again in the qualifying round. The loser would be eliminated from the tournament. With Puerto Rico leading 5–3 in the 9th inning, singles by Shane Victorino and Brian Roberts and walks by Jimmy Rollins and Kevin Youkilis cut the lead to 5–4 for New York Mets third baseman David Wright, who looped a barely-fair single into right that brought in Roberts and Rollins to win the game, 6–5, advancing to the semifinals while eliminating Puerto Rico. The United States would go on to lose to Japan 9–4 in the second semifinal.

2013: Stiffer competition; America misses the finals again

The United States team competed in Pool D of the 2013 World Baseball Classic along with Italy, Canada, and Mexico. The U.S. team lost to Mexico in the first round 5-2, but later won two games against Canada and Italy, securing their place for the second round, along with Italy, on Pool 2.

On March 12, they beat Puerto Rico 7-1, which then proceeded to face off against the Dominican Republic on March 14, losing 3-1 where they face off Puerto Rico once again the next day, as Puerto Rico beat the American team 4-3 (as revenge for being eliminated from the 2009 World Baseball Classic), thus eliminating them from the tournament.

2017: First championship
The Americans won their first game over Colombia, 3-2, in 10 innings on a walk-off single by Adam Jones. After losing to the Dominican Republic after having a 5-run lead, the U.S. defeated Canada to reach the Second Round.

In the Second Round the Americans won the first game of the round defeating Venezuela 4-2. In the second game the U.S. was defeated by Puerto Rico 6-5 after giving up 4 runs in the 1st inning. The U.S. then defeated the Dominican Republic to advance to the Championship Round.

In the Championship Round Semifinals on March 21, the Americans defeated Japan 2-1 to advance to their first-ever appearance in the Final. In the Final on March 22, the U.S. once again faced Puerto Rico; the U.S. however, ended up winning 8-0 capturing the first ever World Baseball Classic Title for the United States. Following the conclusion of the tournament, Eric Hosmer, Christian Yelich, and Marcus Stroman were named to the 2017 All-World Baseball Classic team.

Olympic Games

Background
Baseball unofficially debuted at the Summer Olympics of 1904 in St. Louis. Single exhibition games were played in conjunction with five Olympics: 1912 in Stockholm, 1936 in Berlin, 1952 in Helsinki, 1956 in Melbourne, and 1964 in Tokyo. The 1952 exhibition was of a Finnish variant of baseball known as pesäpallo.

The 1984 Summer Olympics in Los Angeles was the first to feature a tournament in the program. Eight teams competed in the tournament held at Dodger Stadium. Cuba, after winning the gold medal at the 1983 Pan American Games, was to participate, but did not as a result of the Soviet-led boycott. The United States national team (Team USA) finished second, falling to Japan in the final game, 6–3. No official medals were awarded as baseball was a demonstration sport.

Baseball returned as a demonstration sport at the 1988 Summer Olympics in Seoul. Again an eight-team tournament, the United States finished first in the tournament, defeating Japan, 5–3, in the final game.

Baseball became an official medal sport beginning with the 1992 Summer Olympics in Barcelona. Competition was open only to male amateurs in 1992 and 1996. As a result, Team USA and other nations where professional baseball is developed relied on college baseball players, while Cuba used their most experienced veterans, who technically were considered amateurs as they nominally held other jobs. Professional baseball players were introduced in 2000, but the situation remained largely the same. No active players from Major League Baseball (MLB) competed—as MLB declined to release its players—so Team USA utilized minor-league players and free agents, while Cuba and some other nations were still able to use their best players, as they had no commitments with MLB.

At the International Olympic Committee (IOC) meeting on July 8, 2005, baseball and softball were voted out of the 2012 Summer Olympics in London, becoming the first sports voted out of the Olympics since polo was eliminated from the 1936 Summer Olympics. The IOC cited the absence of the best players as the main reason for baseball being dropped from the Olympic program following the 2008 games. Baseball returned to the Olympic program for the 2020 games, held in 2021 in Tokyo. It will not be part of the 2024 games in Paris, but is scheduled for the 2028 games in Los Angeles.

1992: Fourth in Barcelona

Team USA had a 5–2 record in pool play, then lost to Cuba in the semifinals, followed by a loss to Japan in the bronze-medal match.

Pitchers (8):
 Willie Adams, Stanford
 Jeff Alkire (L), Miami
 Darren Dreifort, Wichita State
 Rick Greene, LSU
 Rick Helling, Stanford
 Daron Kirkreit, UC Riverside
 Ron Villone (L), UMass
 B. J. Wallace (L), Mississippi State

Pitcher / Outfielder (1):
 Chris Roberts (L), Florida State

Catchers (2):
 Charles Johnson, Miami
 Jason Varitek, Georgia Tech

Infielders (6):
 Nomar Garciaparra, Georgia Tech
 Jason Giambi, Long Beach State
 Phil Nevin, Cal State Fullerton
 Michael Tucker, Longwood
 Craig Wilson, Kansas State
 Chris Wimmer, Wichita State

Outfielders (3):
 Jeffrey Hammonds, Stanford
 Chad McConnell, Creighton
 Calvin Murray, Texas

Manager: Ron Fraser, Miami

Note: Jason Moler of Cal State Fullerton was initially named to the squad as one of the catchers, but was replaced by Varitek due to injury prior to the start of the competition.

Source:

1996: Bronze in Atlanta

Team USA had a 6–1 record in pool play, then lost to Japan in the semifinals, followed by a win over Nicaragua in the bronze-medal match.

 Chad Allen
 Kris Benson
 R. A. Dickey
 Troy Glaus
 Chad Green
 Seth Greisinger
 Kip Harkrider
 A. J. Hinch
 Jacque Jones
 Billy Koch
 Mark Kotsay
 Matt LeCroy
 Travis Lee
 Brian Loyd
 Braden Looper
 Warren Morris
 Augie Ojeda
 Jim Parque
 Jeff Weaver
 Jason Williams

Manager: Skip Bertman

Source:

2000: Gold in Sydney

Team USA had a 6–1 record in pool play, then defeated South Korea in the semifinals, followed by a win over Cuba in the gold-medal game.

 Brent Abernathy
 Kurt Ainsworth
 Pat Borders
 Sean Burroughs
 John Cotton
 Travis Dawkins
 Adam Everett
 Ryan Franklin
 Chris George
 Shane Heams
 Marcus Jensen
 Mike Kinkade
 Rick Krivda
 Doug Mientkiewicz
 Mike Neill
 Roy Oswalt
 Jon Rauch
 Anthony Sanders
 Bobby Seay
 Ben Sheets
 Brad Wilkerson
 Todd Williams
 Ernie Young
 Tim Young

Manager: Tommy Lasorda

Source:

2004: Did not qualify for Athens

2008: Bronze in Beijing

Team USA qualified for the 2008 Summer Olympics by winning the American Qualifying Tournament. In Beijing, Team USA had a 5–2 record in pool play, then lost to Cuba in the semifinals, followed by a win over Japan in the bronze-medal match.

2020: Silver in Tokyo

In November 2019, with Scott Brosius as manager, the team initially failed to qualify at the 2019 WBSC Premier12 Tournament. The team subsequently qualified, with Mike Scioscia as manager, by winning the Americas Qualifying Event held from May 31 to June 5, 2021, in Florida. Luke Williams led the team in batting average (.444), runs (6), hits (8), and RBIs (6), Todd Frazier and Mark Kolozsvary led in home runs (2), and David Robertson led the team in saves (2).

At the Olympics, the team first won its three-team pool, via victories over South Korea and Israel. In the modified double-elimination bracket, the team lost to Japan in the second round, then defeated the Dominican Republic in the repechage and South Korea in the semi-finals and advanced to the gold medal game where the team lost to Japan for the second time. Team Japan was made up of players from Nippon Professional Baseball, which paused its season for the Olympics, while Team USA fielded minor-league players and free agents with major-league experience.

The team's roster for the Olympics was released on July 2, 2021.

Premier12 Tournament

2015
Team USA came in second in the 2015 WBSC Premier12 Tournament.

2019
Team USA came in fourth in the 12-team 2019 WBSC Premier12 Tournament in November 2019. Two quota spots were allocated from the Tournament, of the spots for six baseball teams at the 2020 Olympic Games, with third-place Mexico as the top finisher from the Americas earning one spot and Team USA not earning a spot. Team USA did not include players who were on their teams' 40-man MLB rosters, being made up of minor league players, including former First Round MLB draft picks Jo Adell, Tanner Houck, and Brent Rooker (2017 MLB draft), Alec Bohm and Xavier Edwards (2018 MLB draft), and Andrew Vaughn (2019 MLB draft). Other teams used their top-level players.

Amateur World Series and Baseball World Cup
The U.S. lost the inaugural Amateur World Series in 1938.

In , the Amateur World Series became the International Baseball Federation's (IBAF) World Cup.

Since 1938, the U.S. has won 15 medals at the Baseball World Cup: four gold (1973, 1974, 2007, 2009), seven silver (1938, 1969, 1970, 1972, 1978, 1988, 2001), and four bronze (1939, 1940, 1982, 1984).

The U.S. was usually represented by college players in these tournaments, while Cuba used its best players.

2007
The U.S. was in group A of the  IBAF World Cup, along with Republic of China, Japan, Mexico, Panama, Italy, Spain and South Africa. The U.S. went 6–1 to win their group, with their only loss coming on November 9,  against Italy. It was the U.S.'s first loss to Italy in 21 years and the first time it ever lost to Italy with professional players, as the team consisted of minor league prospects.

This one loss, however, would be their only. The U.S. went on to beat Korea, Netherlands, and Cuba to capture the gold.

2009
In Round 1 of the 2009 Baseball World Cup, the U.S. (2–1) finished second in Group E and advanced with first-place Venezuela (3–0). In Round 2, the U.S. was joined by the nine other first- and second-place teams from Round 1, four wild-card teams, and the two principal host teams (Italy and the Netherlands). The 16 teams were divided into Groups F and G. The U.S. (7–0) defeated each of the other seven teams in Group G. In Round 3, the first four teams in Group F were renamed Group 1 and the first four teams in Group G were renamed Group 2. The U.S. finished first in Group 2 with a record of 7–0; Cuba finished first in Group 1, with a 5–2 record. In the Final Round, Group 1 and 2's fourth-place teams competed for overall seventh place; the two third-place teams competed for overall fifth place; and the two second-place teams competed for the bronze medal. In the gold-medal game, the U.S. defeated Cuba, 10–5.

Tournament awards were given to Justin Smoak (MVP) and Todd Redmond (best won/loss average (pitcher)). Smoak (first base) was also named to the tournament All-Star Team, along with Jon Weber (outfield) and Terry Tiffee (designated hitter).

Intercontinental Cup
The Intercontinental Cup is a tournament between the members of the IBAF. Since, there has been a competition in  & , both of which, the U.S. has chosen to sit out. The tournament has been dominated by Cuba, who has won ten gold & three silver in the 16 tournaments. Japan is second in medal ranking, with two gold, five silver & five bronze, and the U.S. is third, with two gold, four silver & two bronze. The United States use college players in this tournament, while Cuba sends its best players.

Future big leaguers have competed in the Intercontinental Cup for the U.S. including Joe Carter, Terry Francona, Mickey Morandini, John Olerud, and Robin Ventura.

Pan American Games
The U.S. has finished second behind Cuba eight of the 12 times they have brought home the gold. Likewise, when the U.S. won the gold medal at the 1967 Pan American Games, Cuba finished second. The U.S. roster is usually composed of promising college players, while Cuba is able to send its best players.

In total, the U.S. has won one gold medal, ten silver medals, and three bronze. For the 1995 games, the U.S. did not send their national team, but instead the St. John's University baseball team, who finished 0–4 against the international all-star teams.

Haarlem Baseball Week

World Port Tournament

Collegiate National Team
USA Baseball also fields a Collegiate National Team which has 22 members of top collegiate baseball players in the country, consisting of five infielders, four outfielders, two catchers, nine pitchers, and a pair of two-way players. The team competes in exhibition games across the U.S. and overseas against teams from across the world, including teams from Canada, Chinese Taipei (Taiwan) and the Netherlands. The 2009 team won the World Baseball Challenge in Canada.

Players who took the field for the Collegiate National Team and have gone on to Major League Baseball success include such notables as Jim Abbott, Kris Bryant, Troy Glaus, Todd Helton, Ryan Howard, Barry Larkin, Tino Martinez, Dustin Pedroia, David Price, Huston Street, Mark Teixeira, Troy Tulowitzki, Trea Turner, Jason Varitek, Carlos Rodon, and Ryan Zimmerman.

Other national teams

The USA won the gold medal in the first ever World Games in 1981 with a roster of college players. Franklin Stubbs, Oddibe McDowell, Spike Owen, and some others went on to play in MLB.

USA Baseball also fields 18U, 15U, and 12U national baseball teams. Former national teams included 16U and 14U national teams. USA Baseball also hosts two national team development programs in the age divisions of 17U and 14U. The selection processes for these programs can be found on the official website of USA Baseball and these team programs also have their respective Twitter pages.

See also

 United States women's national baseball team
 USA Baseball
 USA Baseball National Training Complex
 Major League Baseball
 Puerto Rico national baseball team
 Baseball at the 1981 World Games

Notes

External links

 
National baseball teams